Al-Hads is a sub-district located in al-Sayyani District, Ibb Governorate, Yemen. Al-Hads had a population of 15290 according to the 2004 census.

References 

Sub-districts in As Sayyani District